Lieutenant Colonel Charles Malone Betts (August 9, 1838 – November 10, 1905) was an American soldier who fought in the American Civil War. Betts received the country's highest award for bravery during combat, the Medal of Honor, for his action in Greensboro, North Carolina on 19 April 1865. He was honored with the award on 10 October 1892.

Biography
Born August 9, 1838, Betts grew up on a farm in Bucks County, Pennsylvania. He attended the Loller Academy in Hatboro, Pennsylvania and then the Gummere's School in Burlington, New Jersey. After the outbreak of the Civil War he first joined a military company in Pennsylvania and then formed part of the Army of the Potomac in Alexandria, Virginia. He later returned to Pennsylvania and, on August 12, 1862, mustered into the 15th Pennsylvania Cavalry.

He was involved in the battles of Stone River and a battle with Cherokee Indians near Gatlinburg in East Tennessee, among others. In April 1865, as lieutenant colonel in command of his regiment captured enemy wagons containing a large quantity of silver coins, bank notes and bonds, all valued at approximately $4 million, in addition to other items.

He was awarded the Medal of honor for leading his regiment to successfully capture a South Carolina cavalry battalion near Greensboro, North Carolina.

Betts mustered out of the army on 21 June 1865. After the war he was involved with various lumber firms in Philadelphia, Pennsylvania and New York. He was also a member of the Pennsylvania Commandery, Military Order of the Loyal Legion and president of the  Lumbermen's Exchange in 1890.

Betts died on November 10, 1905, and was buried West Laurel Hill Cemetery.

Medal of Honor citation

See also

List of American Civil War Medal of Honor recipients: A–F

References

External links
Lieutenant-Colonel Charles M. Betts, U.S.V.

1838 births
1905 deaths
People of Pennsylvania in the American Civil War
Union Army officers
United States Army Medal of Honor recipients
American Civil War recipients of the Medal of Honor
Burials at West Laurel Hill Cemetery